When Love Comes Calling is an EP by the American jazz/soul guitarist George Benson. It was released on 12" vinyl and CD in 1996 through GRP Records in Europe. 12" vinyl edition contains three songs from the album "That's Right" and the radio edit of "When Love Comes Calling". CD edition contains two songs from the album "That's Right" and an edited version of "When Love Comes Calling".

12" vinyl track listing

CD track listing

Personnel

When Love Comes Calling (Radio Edit) & (Album Version) 
 George Benson - lead vocals & guitar
 Simon Hale - string arrangement
 Maxton Gig Beesley, Jr. - keyboards, piano & vibes
 Graham Harvey - acoustic piano
 Julian Crampton - bass
 Richard Bull - drum & percussion programming
 J.P. 'Bluey' Maunick - drum programming
 Frayaz Virji - trombone & horn arrangement
 Kevin Robinson - trumpet & flugel horn
 Bud Beadle - alto saxophone & flute
 Joy Malcolm - background vocals
 Mark Anthoni - background vocals

That's Right (Album Version) 
 George Benson - lead guitar
 Ricky Peterson - drum programming & arrangement
 John Clayton, Ricky Peterson - string arrangement
 Paul Peterson - bass & rhythm guitar
 Michael Bland - drums
 Ricky Peterson - keyboards & organ

The Thinker (Album Version) 
 George Benson - lead guitar
 Ricky Peterson - drum programming & arrangement
 Paul Peterson - bass & rhythm guitar
 Michael Bland - drums
 Ricky Peterson - keyboards & organ

True Blue 
 George Benson - lead guitar
 Ricky Peterson - drum programming & arrangement
 Jonh Clayton, Ricky Peterson - string arrangement
 Paul Peterson - bass & rhythm guitar
 Michael Bland - drums
 Ricky Peterson - keyboards & organ

Producers 
 Jean-Paul 'Bluey' Maunick (tracks: 1, 2),
 Ricky Peterson (tracks: 3, 4),
 Tommy LiPuma (tracks: 3, 4).

References 

1996 EPs